Eugene McLanahan Wilson (December 25, 1833 – April 10, 1890) was an American lawyer and Democratic politician who served in various legal and political offices in Minnesota including as a member of Congress and as the fifth and seventh mayor of Minneapolis.

Early life
Wilson was born in Morgantown, Monongalia County, Virginia (now West Virginia) on December 25, 1833. His father Edgar C. Wilson had been a lawyer and US representative from Virginia (as had his grandfather Thomas Wilson). On his mother's side he was the great-grandson of Isaac Griffin, also a longtime US Representative from Pennsylvania. He attended school in Morgantown and graduated from Jefferson College in 1852. He studied law, was admitted to the bar in 1855 and relocated to Minnesota shortly thereafter.

Career

Wilson worked in Winona, Minnesota for several years in a law practice with former classmate William B. Mitchell. In 1857 he was named United States Attorney for the District of Minnesota and relocated to Minneapolis. During the Civil War Wilson served in the Union Army as captain of Company A in the 1st Minnesota Volunteer Cavalry Regiment. The regiment was primarily involved with the Dakota War of 1862.

After the war, Wilson was elected to the Forty-first Congress (1869 – 1871). He was not a candidate for renomination in 1870. He resumed the practice of law, and was elected mayor of Minneapolis in 1872 and 1874. He was an unsuccessful candidate for election in 1874 to the Forty-fourth Congress. He served as a delegate to the Democratic National Convention in 1876 and was a member of the Minnesota Senate in 1878 and 1879. He was an unsuccessful candidate for Governor of Minnesota in 1888.

Wilson remained active in social as well as political affairs in Minnesota. He was twice president of the Minneapolis Club, in 1886 and 1890.

Personal life
Wilson married Elizabeth Kimball, daughter of Colonel William M. Kimball, of Minneapolis on October 6, 1865. Together, they had four children.

Death
Wilson died while on a visit to regain his health in Nassau, British West Indies (now The Bahamas) on April 10, 1890. He was interred in Lakewood Cemetery, Minneapolis, Minnesota.

Electoral history
Minneapolis Mayoral Election, 1872
Eugene McLanahan Wilson 2,208	
Dorilus Morrison 1,534	
Minneapolis Mayoral Election, 1874
Eugene McLanahan Wilson 2,533	
George A. Brackett 2,147		
John H. Thompson 415

References

 Retrieved on 2009-04-13

1833 births
1890 deaths
Democratic Party Minnesota state senators
Mayors of Minneapolis
Union Army officers
People of Minnesota in the American Civil War
Washington & Jefferson College alumni
United States Attorneys for the District of Minnesota
Democratic Party members of the United States House of Representatives from Minnesota
Burials at Lakewood Cemetery
19th-century American politicians